Spilaethalida is a genus of moths in the family Erebidae from New Guinea and Northern Australia. One undescribed species occurs in Sulawesi.

Species
 Spilaethalida turbida (Butler, 1882)
 Spilaethalida erythrastis (Meyrick, 1886)

References
 , 2007: Spilaethalida, a new genus for the New Guinean and Australian Spilarctia turbida complex (Lepidoptera, Arctiidae). Euroasian Entomological Journal 6 (3): 324-326, 342, color plate VII, fig. 1-6.
Natural History Museum Lepidoptera generic names catalog

Spilosomina
Moths of Australia
Moth genera